The McGuire Programme is a stammering or stuttering programme/course run for people who stammer or stutter  by people who stammer. It was founded in 1994 by American Dave McGuire.

Scottish international rugby union captain, Kelly Brown, is a graduate of the course. Singer Gareth Gates attended the programme's workshops and subsequently qualified as a speech instructor himself. Stammering awareness activist Adam Black, also a graduate of the course, received a British Empire Medal in the 2019 New Year Honours list where his work raising awareness of stammering was recognised.

References

External links
 Official website

Speech disorders